"(They Long to Be) Close to You" is a song written by Burt Bacharach and Hal David. The best-known version is that recorded by American duo the Carpenters for their second studio album Close to You (1970) and produced by Jack Daugherty. Released on May 14, 1970, the single topped both the US Billboard Hot 100 and Adult Contemporary charts. It also reached the top of the Canadian and Australian charts and peaked at number six on the charts of both the UK and Ireland. The record was certified gold by the Recording Industry Association of America (RIAA) in August 1970.

Early versions
The song was first recorded by Richard Chamberlain and released as a single in 1963 as "They Long to Be Close to You". However, while the single's other side, "Blue Guitar", became a hit, "They Long to Be Close to You" did not. The tune was also recorded as a demo by Dionne Warwick in 1963, was re-recorded with a Burt Bacharach arrangement for her album Make Way for Dionne Warwick (1964), and was released as the B-side of her 1965 single "Here I Am". Dusty Springfield recorded the song in August 1964, but her version was not released commercially until it appeared on her album Where Am I Going? (1967). Bacharach released his own version in 1971. But the version recorded by Carpenters with instrumental backing by L.A. studio musicians from the Wrecking Crew, which became a hit in 1970, was the most successful.

Carpenters version

In 1970, "(They Long to Be) Close to You" was released by the Carpenters on their album Close to You (1970) and became their breakthrough hit. The song stayed at number one on the Billboard Hot 100 for four weeks. "(They Long to Be) Close to You" was named Billboards Song of the Summer for 1970.

Bacharach and David gave Herb Alpert the song after he scored a number one hit in 1968 with "This Guy's in Love with You", which the duo had also written. Alpert recorded the song, but he was displeased with the recording and did not release it. After the Carpenters achieved their first chart success with "Ticket to Ride" in 1969, Alpert convinced them to record their version of the song, believing it was well-suited for them.

Carpenter and Alpert collaborated on the song, and the finished product was a 4-minute, 36-second long song. When A&M Records decided to remove the extended coda and release it as a 3-minute, 40-second long single in May 1970, it became A&M's biggest hit since Alpert's "This Guy's in Love with You" from 1968. Billboard ranked it as the number two song for 1970.

"(They Long to Be) Close to You" earned the Carpenters a Grammy Award for Best Contemporary Performance by a Duo, Group or Chorus in 1971. It became the first of three Grammy Awards they would win during their careers. The song was certified gold by the Recording Industry Association of America (RIAA) on August 12, 1970. Reaching number six on the UK Singles Chart in 1970, in a UK television special on ITV in 2016 it was voted fourth in "The Nation's Favourite Carpenters Song".

Composition
Richard had originally written the flugelhorn solo part for Herb Alpert, but when he was unavailable, Chuck Findley was brought in. Richard later commented: "Chuck didn't play it that way at first, but I worked with him and he nailed it. A lot of people thought it was Herb – Bacharach thought so, too. But it's the way Findley is playing it."

The arrangement was completely different from the version Bacharach cut with Richard Chamberlain, with one exception.  When Richard asked Bacharach for permission (as a courtesy) to redo the song, Bacharach requested that he keep the two "five note groupings" (piano ornaments) at the end of the first bridge.  Bacharach recalled his initial reaction on hearing the finished product: "Man, this is just great! I completely blew it with Richard Chamberlain but now someone else has come along and made a record so much better than mine." 

Personnel
Karen Carpenter – lead and backing vocals
Richard Carpenter – backing vocals, piano, Wurlitzer electronic piano, harpsichord, orchestration
Joe Osborn – bass
Hal Blaine – drums
Chuck Findley – trumpet
Bob Messenger – flute
 uncredited – vibraphone

Chart performance

Weekly charts

Year-end charts

All-time charts

Certifications

Gwen Guthrie version

In 1986, Gwen Guthrie released her version of the song, which could only partially build on the success of her hit Ain't Nothin' Goin' On but the Rent. Compared to the original, this version is very synthesizer-heavy and is adapted to the time.

 Music video 
In the music video, Gwen Guthrie sings the song on a stage while the crowd dances and papparazi crowd the stage.

 Track listing 12" Maxi'	
 (They Long To Be) Close To You 7:14	
 You Touched My Life 5:07	
 Save Your Love For Me 4:50

Charts

References

External links
 
 The Carpenters - Close to You (Music Video VHS, A&M) on Internet Archive

1970s ballads
1970 singles
1986 singles
A&M Records singles
The Carpenters songs
Dionne Warwick songs
Isaac Hayes songs
Richard Chamberlain songs
Andy Williams songs
The Cranberries songs
Billboard Hot 100 number-one singles
Cashbox number-one singles
Number-one singles in Australia
RPM Top Singles number-one singles
Songs with lyrics by Hal David
Songs with music by Burt Bacharach
Diana Ross songs
Dami Im songs
1963 songs
Pop ballads
Rock ballads